3-Fluoro-PCP (3'-F-PCP, 3F-PCP) is a recreational designer drug from the arylcyclohexylamine family, with dissociative effects. It was first identified in Slovenia in October 2020, and was made illegal in Hungary in April 2021.

See also 
 3-Fluorodeschloroketamine
 3-Chloro-PCP
 3-Methyl-PCP
 3-MeO-PCP
 4-Keto-PCP
 Fluorexetamine

References 

Arylcyclohexylamines
Designer drugs
Dissociative drugs
4-Piperidinyl compounds
Fluoroarenes